In nonstandard analysis, a branch of mathematics, a hyperfinite set or *-finite set is a type of internal set. An internal set H of internal cardinality g ∈ *N (the hypernaturals) is hyperfinite if and only if there exists an internal bijection between G = {1,2,3,...,g} and H. Hyperfinite sets share the properties of finite sets: A hyperfinite set has minimal and maximal elements, and a hyperfinite union of a hyperfinite collection of hyperfinite sets may be derived. The sum of the elements of any hyperfinite subset of *R always exists, leading to the possibility of well-defined integration.

Hyperfinite sets can be used to approximate other sets. If a hyperfinite set approximates an interval, it is called a near interval with respect to that interval. Consider a hyperfinite set  with a hypernatural n. K is a near interval for [a,b] if k1 = a and kn = b, and if the difference between successive elements of K is infinitesimal. Phrased otherwise, the requirement is that for every r ∈ [a,b] there is a ki ∈ K such that ki ≈ r. This, for example, allows for an approximation to the unit circle, considered as the set  for θ in the interval [0,2π].

In general, subsets of hyperfinite sets are not hyperfinite, often because they do not contain the extreme elements of the parent set.

Ultrapower construction
In terms of the ultrapower construction, the hyperreal line *R is defined as the collection of equivalence classes of sequences  of real numbers un.  Namely, the equivalence class defines a hyperreal, denoted  in Goldblatt's notation.  Similarly, an arbitrary hyperfinite set in *R is of the form , and is defined by a sequence  of finite sets

References

External links 

Nonstandard analysis